Hossein Ghomi (born 28 October 1982) was an Iranian judoka.

He finished in joint fifth place in the middleweight (90 kg) division at the 2006 Asian Games, having lost to Ramziddin Sayidov of Uzbekistan in the bronze medal match.

External links
 2006 Asian Games profile

1982 births
Living people
Iranian male judoka
Judoka at the 2008 Summer Olympics
Olympic judoka of Iran
Judoka at the 2006 Asian Games
Judoka at the 2010 Asian Games
Asian Games competitors for Iran
21st-century Iranian people